The 1909 Wyoming Cowboys football team represented the University of Wyoming as an independent during the 1909 college football season. In their first season under head coach Harold I. Dean, the team compiled a 3–5 record and was outscored by a total of 170 to 93. M. E. Corthell was the team captain

Schedule

References

Wyoming
Wyoming Cowboys football seasons
Wyoming Cowboys football